Linas Alsenas (born 1979 in Cleveland, Ohio) is a gay Lithuanian-American author and book illustrator. After attending Harvard University, where he was an illustrator for the campus newspaper, he moved to New York City and worked as an editor for Interior Design magazine and then at Abrams Books for Young Readers. In 2006, Scholastic released his first picture book, Mrs. Claus Takes a Vacation, which he wrote and illustrated. In 2007, Scholastic released Peanut, followed by Hello My Name Is Bob in 2009.

Alsenas is also the author of Gay America: Struggle For Equality, published by Amulet Books in 2008, the first gay history textbook written for teens. The book was an American Library Association's Stonewall Book Awards Children's and Young Adult Literature Award Honor Book in 2010.

Alsenas lived in Stockholm, Sweden with his husband, Jan Wilhelmsson. He moved to London in 2013 and works at Scholastic.

External links
linasalsenas.com
LinkedIn profile

References

1979 births
21st-century American writers
American children's writers
American people of Lithuanian descent
American gay writers
Harvard University alumni
LGBT people from Ohio
Living people
Artists from Cleveland
Writers from New York City
Writers from Cleveland
Writers from Stockholm
American writers of young adult literature
Writers who illustrated their own writing
American expatriates in England